Branislav "Bane" Trifunović (born 16 January 1978), is a Serbian actor and film producer.

Trifunović made numerous award-winning appearances in films, including Goose Feather, A View from Eiffel Tower, Wait for Me and I Will Not Come, Here and There and Monument to Michael Jackson. He is also known for his active and prolific career on stage.

He voiced Boog in the Serbian dub of the Open Season franchise.

Personal life
Trifunović was born to Tomislav, an actor, and Slobodanka, a lawyer. His elder brother, Sergej (born 1972), is also an actor. In 2007, he stated that it had taken a lot of effort to stop being referred as "Sergej Trifunović's younger brother". He is a FK Red Star supporter.

Filmography

Awards and nominations

References

External links 
 Branislav Trifunović at the Internet Movie Database

1978 births
Living people
People from Kruševac
Serbian male television actors
Serbian male film actors
Serbian male voice actors
Serbian male stage actors
Serbian film producers